Aurophora is a genus of fungi in the family Sarcoscyphaceae. This is a monotypic genus, containing the single species Aurophora dochmia, which has a widespread distribution in pantropical areas.

References

External links
Aurophora at Index Fungorum

Sarcoscyphaceae
Monotypic Ascomycota genera